The 2020–21 Richmond Spiders women's basketball team represented the University of Richmond during the 2020–21 NCAA Division I women's basketball season. The Spiders, led by second-year head coach Aaron Roussell, played their home games at the Robins Center and were members of the Atlantic 10 Conference.

Previous season
The Spiders finished the 2019–20 season with a record of 15–17, 7–9 in A-10 play to finish in a tie for ninth place. They earned the ninth seed in the A-10 women's tournament by virtue of a head-to-head tiebreaker over La Salle and defeated No. 8 seed George Washington on the road in the first round. The Spiders then fell to No. 1 seed Dayton in the second round.

Roster

Schedule
Richmond's 2020–21 non-conference schedule was planned to include 8 games, although adjustments due to the COVID-19 pandemic resulted in the cancelation of three games.

In the Atlantic 10 portion of the schedule, Richmond was scheduled to play a total of 18 games, including home and away games against VCU, George Washington, Rhode Island, Massachusetts, and George Mason. In addition, Richmond was schedule to host Fordham, Davidson, St. Joseph's and La Salle and travel to St. Bonaventure, Duquesne, Dayton, and Saint Louis. The Fordham and Davidson games, as well as the home Massachusetts game, were postponed and ultimately canceled due to impacts of the COVID-19 pandemic.

|-
!colspan=9 style=| Non-conference regular season

|-
!colspan=9 style=| Atlantic 10 regular season

|-
!colspan=9 style=| Non-conference regular season

|-
!colspan=9 style=| Atlantic 10 regular season

|-
!colspan=9 style=| Atlantic 10 Tournament

Source:

References

Richmond Spiders women's basketball seasons
Richmond